Cee Lo's Magic Moment is the first Christmas studio album and overall fourth studio album released by American recording artist Cee Lo Green on October 29, 2012, in the United Kingdom. It was released to the US on October 30  by Elektra Records. Green's versions of "Mary, Did You Know?" and "What Christmas Means to Me" peaked at numbers 22 and 23 on the December 22, 2012 R&B Songs chart in the United States. The album has sold 181,000 copies in the United States in 2012. It is Cee Lo Green's first solo album to not contain a Parental Advisory label.

Background
The album features a variety of Green's interpretations of classic Christmas and seasonal songs. The album features collaborations with Rod Stewart, Christina Aguilera, Straight No Chaser, Trombone Shorty and The Muppets. Stewart and The Muppets joined Green for a performance of the festive set at the Planet Hollywood Resort and Casino in Las Vegas on October 10, 2012. The special was filmed and premiered on Warner Music Group's YouTube channel on November 26.

A music video was produced for "All I Need Is Love", which featured Cee-Lo, the Muppets and Craig Robinson, as well as Muppet performers Steve Whitmire, Eric Jacobson, Dave Goelz, Bill Barretta, David Rudman, Matt Vogel, and Peter Linz.

Critical reception

Cee Lo's Magic Moment received generally positive reviews from music critics. At Metacritic, which assigns a normalized rating out of 100 to reviews from mainstream critics, the album received an average score of 63 based on 9 reviews, which indicates "generally favorable reviews".

Commercial performance

In the United States, the album debuted at  No. 2 on the Billboard 200 albums chart on its first week of release, selling around 437,689 copies. It peaked at No. 1 on the chart. It also peaked at No. 4 on Billboard'''s Top R&B/Hip-Hop Albums,  and No. 6 on the Holiday Albums chart.  It was ranked No. 153 on the 2013 Year End Billboard'' 200 chart. As of October 2015, the album has sold 225,000 copies in the US.

Track listing

Charts

Weekly charts

Year-end charts

Release history

References

2012 Christmas albums
CeeLo Green albums
Christmas albums by American artists
Contemporary R&B Christmas albums
Elektra Records albums
Warner Records albums